Espen Haug (born 30 January 30, 1970 in Oslo) is a Norwegian football coach. He is the current youth coach of Strømmen, and previously coached Drøbak/Frogn. In his active career he played for Strømmen, Vålerenga, Lyn, Ham-Kam and Hønefoss.

Playing career
He won the Norwegian Football Cup with Vålerenga in 1997, and scored one of the goals when Strømsgodset were beaten 4-2.

He came to Ham-Kam from Lyn in front of the 2002 season and made his debut against Ørn-Horten 14 April 2002. When Ham-Kam were promoted in 2003, it became the third club Espen Haug earned promotion to Tippeligaen with.

Managerial career
In the middle of the 2006 season, he went to Hønefoss. Espen Haug was appointed coach in Drøbak/Frogn after the coach and athletic director Håvard Lunde resigned as head coach for the club in 2007 season. In the 2009 season had a tough start, and Drøbak/Frogn was positioned at the bottom half of the Second Division table. Drøbak/Frogn's fans were not happy with the development of the team and asked the board for reaction. The chairman, Arild Dregelid, went out in the media and said Espen Haug had the boards confidence, and that he would continue as head coach. But when the poor results continued, Espen Haug was exempt from his duties as head coach for the team.

Honours
Norwegian Football Cup: 1997

External links
 Lynfotball.no – Espen Haugs player profile at Lyn
 Espen Haugs player profile at hamkam.no
 Espen Haugs profile at nifs.no

1970 births
Living people
Norwegian footballers
Strømmen IF players
Vålerenga Fotball players
Lyn Fotball players
Hamarkameratene players
Hønefoss BK players
Norwegian football managers
Association football midfielders
Footballers from Oslo